Howard Shaw may refer to:

 Howard Van Doren Shaw (1869–1926), American architect
 Howard Shaw (author) (born 1934), British teacher and writer
 SS Howard L. Shaw, a Great Lakes freighter

See also

 Shaw–Howard University station, a station on the Washington Metro often referred to as Shaw-Howard